The Philippines has competed in every edition of the Summer Olympic Games since its debut in the 1924 edition, except when they participated in the American-led boycott of the 1980 Summer Olympics. Filipino athletes have also competed at the Winter Olympic Games on five occasions since 1972.

The country has also participated in the Summer Youth Olympic Games as well as in the Winter Youth Olympic Games.

Participation

Participation of Filipino athletes in the Olympics is sanctioned by its National Olympic Committee (NOC). Its NOC since 1975 is the Philippine Olympic Committee (POC). Prior to that date, the Philippines was represented by the POC's predecessor, the Philippine Amateur Athletic Federation which was founded in 1911. The Philippines is a recognized member of the International Olympic Committee since 1929.

Filipino athletes have won a total of fourteen Olympic medals (as of 2020 Summer Olympics), with boxing as the top medal-producing sport. On July 26, 2021, the Philippines clinched its first gold medal at the 2020 Summer Olympics in Tokyo, with Hidilyn Diaz winning the Women's 55 kg event in Weightlifting. Furthermore, with a 1-2-1 haul in its best Olympics yet, the Philippines emerged as the best performing Southeast Asian nation, a title they last held coincidentally in 1964, in Tokyo and leaped to third in the all-time medal table for Southeast Asia behind Thailand and Indonesia.

Summer Olympic Games
The Philippines first competed in the Olympic Games in 1924 in Paris, making it the first country from Southeast Asia to compete and, later in 1928, win a medal. The nation has competed at every Summer Olympic Games since then, except when they participated in the American-led boycott of the 1980 Summer Olympics. The Philippines also decided against participating at the 1940 Summer Olympics before the Games was ultimately cancelled due to the outbreak of World War II.

Winter Olympic Games
The Philippines first participated at the Winter Olympic Games in 1972, when it sent two alpine skiers.

Medals

Medals by Summer Games

Medals by Winter Games

Medals by sport

List of medalists
 Twelve athletes have won 14 medals for the Philippines at the Summer Olympics (excluding those athletes that have won medals in demonstration sports, which were not counted in the official medal tally) while no medal has ever been won for the country at the Winter Olympics.

Summary by sport

Boxing

Golf

Gymnastics

Skateboarding

Taekwondo

Weightlifting

Art competitions
The Philippines had representation in art competitions in the Summer Olympics participating in the 1948 games, the last edition of the games in when art competitions were held. Filipino sculptor Graciano Nepomuceno and painter Hernando Ocampo represented the Philippines in 1948.

See also
Olympic competitors for the Philippines
List of flag bearers for the Philippines at the Olympics
Philippines at the Paralympics
Tropical nations at the Winter Olympics
Philippines at the Universiade
Philippines at the Asian Games
Philippines at the Southeast Asian Games

References

External links
 Philippines – International Olympic Committee
 Living Archive of Olympians – Olympians Association of the Philippines